Beatriz Ramo (11 January 1979, Zaragoza) is a Spanish architect and urbanist living and working in Rotterdam where she opened her own architecture firm STAR strategies + architecture in 2006. She studied at ETSAV at the Polytechnic University of Valencia and at the Eindhoven University of Technology.

Since 2008 Beatriz Ramo is the managing and contributing editor of MONU Magazine on Urbanism, with which she has collaborated since its foundation in 2004.

Since June 2012 Beatriz Ramo is part of the Scientific Council of the AIGP- Atelier International du Grand Paris, when STAR strategies + architecture was selected as one of fifteen teams participating in the second edition of the Atelier.

Before founding STAR Beatriz Ramo worked in 2003 and 2004 for the Dutch firm OMA - Office for Metropolitan Architecture in Rotterdam.

References

External links 
 STAR strategies + architecture
 MONU Magazine on Urbanism
BEATRIZ RAMO - STAR STRATEGIES + ARCHITECTURE, REVOLUTIONNER LE LOGEMENT. Accessed October 25, 2021. https://www.youtube.com/watch?v=1lfdaqGxZhI.
Ramo, Beatriz, and Bjarke Ingels. “Real Big : Interview with Bjarke Ingels by Beatriz Ramo.” Monu :  Magazine on Urbanism, no. 12 (January 1, 2014): 74–80.
Ramo, Beatriz, and Djamel Aït-Aïssa. “Behind the Scenes : A Conversation with My Client.” Monu :  Magazine on Urbanism, no. 28 (January 1, 2018): 74–80.
STAR strategies + architecture. “Beatriz Roma.” Accessed October 24, 2021. https://st-ar.nl/about/beatriz-ramo/.

1979 births
Living people
Spanish women architects
Dutch women architects
20th-century Spanish architects
21st-century Spanish architects
20th-century Dutch architects
21st-century Dutch architects
Eindhoven University of Technology alumni
Technical University of Valencia alumni
People from Zaragoza
20th-century Dutch women
20th-century Dutch people
20th-century Spanish women